The fifth and final series of the British children's television series The Story of Tracy Beaker began broadcasting on 28 November 2005 on CBBC and ended on 9 December 2005. The series follows the lives of the children living in the fictional children's care home of Elmtree House, nicknamed by them "The Dumping Ground". It consists of twenty, fifteen-minute episodes. It is the fifth series in The Story of Tracy Beaker franchise.

Cast

Main

Guest

Casting
Georgina Hagen, Holly Gibbs and Olivia Grant were cast as Rebecca Chalmers, Milly and Alice respectively.

Episodes

References

The Story of Tracy Beaker
2005 British television seasons